Cezary Stefańczyk (born February 21, 1984) is a Polish footballer who plays as a defender for Warta Działoszyn.

Career

Club
In June 2011, he joined ŁKS Łódź on a one-year contract. After a half-year spell with Łódź, he terminated his contract and returned to his former team Zawisza Bydgoszcz in the early February 2012.

On 17 August 2020, he returned to his hometown club RKS Radomsko in the fourth-tier III liga.

References

External links 
 

1984 births
People from Radomsko
Sportspeople from Łódź Voivodeship
Living people
Polish footballers
Association football defenders
ŁKS Łódź players
RKS Radomsko players
KSZO Ostrowiec Świętokrzyski players
ŁKS Łomża players
Zawisza Bydgoszcz players
Górnik Łęczna players
Wisła Płock players
Ekstraklasa players
I liga players
II liga players
III liga players